John Lyttle (20 January 1931 – 15 November 1997) was an Irish boxer. He competed in the men's heavyweight event at the 1952 Summer Olympics.

References

1931 births
1997 deaths
Irish male boxers
Olympic boxers of Ireland
Boxers at the 1952 Summer Olympics
Boxers from Belfast
Heavyweight boxers